Anna Hall may refer to:

 Ann Hall (1792–1863), American painter
 Anna E. Hall (1870–1964), American Methodist deaconess and missionary
 Anna Gertrude Hall (1882–1967), American author of children's literature
 Anna Hall (footballer) (born 1979), Swedish footballer
 Anna Hall Roosevelt (1863–1892), mother of  Eleanor Roosevelt
 Anna Maria Hall (1800–1881), Irish novelist
 Anna Sophina Hall (1857–1924), American suffragist and eugenics proponent 
 Anna Hall (athlete) (born 2001), American heptathlete
 Anna Hall (volleyball) (born 1999), American volleyball player

See also 
 Annie Hall, a 1977 film by Woody Allen